The 2017 UCI America Tour was the thirteenth season of the UCI America Tour. The season began on October 24, 2016 with the Vuelta a Guatemala and ended on October 15, 2017.

The points leader, based on the cumulative results of previous races, wears the UCI America Tour cycling jersey. Throughout the season, points are awarded to the top finishers of stages within stage races and the final general classification standings of each of the stages races and one-day events. The quality and complexity of a race also determines how many points are awarded to the top finishers, the higher the UCI rating of a race, the more points are awarded.

The UCI ratings from highest to lowest are as follows:
 Multi-day events: 2.HC, 2.1 and 2.2
 One-day events: 1.HC, 1.1 and 1.2

Events

2016

2017

References

External links
 

 
2017
2017 in men's road cycling
2017 in North American sport
2017 in South American sport